Majorel is an international service company, specializing in customer experience (CX) and business process outsourcing (BPO) services. It has more than 82,000 team members and operates in 45 countries on five continents.

History 
In September 2018, Bertelsmann and Saham announced plans to merge their global customer services businesses. The two companies had already worked together successfully in this area. Following approval by the relevant antitrust authorities, the transaction was completed at the beginning of 2019. The result was a company "with enormous clout", becoming the market leader in Europe, the Middle East and Africa, and a strong presence in America and Asia. The Majorel brand was introduced in February 2019. Since then, the company focused on global expansion.

Structure 
The headquarters of Majorel are located in Luxembourg City. The company operates as a Société Anonyme (SA). On September 24, 2021, the company’s shares were listed on Euronext Amsterdam (Ticker Symbol: MAJ). Thomas Mackenbrock (Chief Executive Officer) leads the management team.

Services 
Majorel is a business-to-business provider whose services span the entire customer lifecycle, including front and back office processes. Its vertical industry expertise includes the automotive and financial industry, as well as many others.

Notes and references

External links 
 

Companies of Luxembourg

Bertelsmann
Financial services companies of Luxembourg
Luxembourgian companies established in 2018
Financial services companies established in 2000